Dungeness is a headland in Kent, England.

Dungeness may also refer to:

Places

Australia 

 Dungeness, Queensland, a town in the locality of Lucinda in the Shire of Hinchinbrook

South America 

 Punta Dúngeness, a headland in Argentina and Chile

United Kingdom 
 Dungeness Lighthouse, one of a series of lighthouses built on the headland
 Dungeness nuclear power station, a nuclear power station on the headland
 Dungeness (SER) railway station, closed 1953
 Dungeness railway station, a light railway station on the headland
 Dungeness, Romney Marsh and Rye Bay, the designated Site of Special Scientific Interest (SSSI).
 Battle of Dungeness, a 1652 battle of the First Anglo-Dutch War

United States 
 Dungeness, Washington, an unincorporated community in Washington, U.S.
 Dungeness Spit, a sand spit in Washington, United States, named after Dungeness headland in England
 Dungeness River, in Washington, U.S.
 Dungeness National Wildlife Refuge, in Washington, U.S.
 Dungeness (Cumberland Island, Georgia), a ruined mansion belonging to Thomas M. Carnegie on Cumberland Island, Georgia

Other 
 Dungeness crab, a species of crab found from the Aleutian Islands in Alaska to Santa Cruz, California
 Dungeness (album), by Trembling Bells (2018)